The 2004 IIHF Ice Hockey World Championship was held between 24 April and 9 May 2004 in Prague and Ostrava, Czech Republic.

It was the 68th ice Hockey World Championships, and was run by the International Ice Hockey Federation (IIHF).

Qualification

Far Eastern Qualification for the tournament was held on 6 September 2003 in Tokyo, Japan.

All times are local.

Final tournament

Venues

Preliminary round
Sixteen participating teams were placed in the following four groups. After playing a round-robin, the top three teams in each group advanced to the qualifying round while the last team competed in the relegation round.

All times are local (UTC+2).

Group A

Group B

Group C

Group D

Qualifying round
The top three teams in the standings of each group of the preliminary round advance to the qualifying round, and are placed in two groups: teams from Groups A and D compete in Group E, while teams from Groups B and C compete in Group F.

Each team is to play three games in this round, one against each of the three teams from the other group with which they have been paired. These three games, along with the two games already played against the other two advancing teams from the same group in the preliminary round, will count in the qualifying round standings.

The top four teams in both groups E and F advanced to the Playoff round.

Group E

Group F

Relegation round

Playoff round

Bracket

Quarterfinals

Semifinals

Bronze medal game

Gold medal game

Ranking and statistics

Tournament Awards
Best players selected by the directorate:
Best Goaltender:       Ty Conklin
Best Defenceman:       Dick Tärnström
Best Forward:          Dany Heatley
Most Valuable Player:  Dany Heatley
Media All-Star Team:
Goaltender:  Henrik Lundqvist
Defence:  Zdeno Chára,  Dick Tärnström
Forwards:  Dany Heatley,  Jaromír Jágr,  Ville Peltonen

Final standings
The final standings of the tournament according to IIHF:

Scoring leaders
List shows the top skaters sorted by points, then goals. If the list exceeds 10 skaters because of a tie in points, all of the tied skaters are left out.
Source: IIHF.com

Leading goaltenders
Only the top five goaltenders, based on save percentage, who have played 40% of their team's minutes are included in this list.
Source: IIHF.com

See also
IIHF World Championship

References

External links
 

 
IIHF World Championship
1
World championships
World Championship, 2004
International ice hockey competitions hosted by the Czech Republic
Sports competitions in Prague
IIHF World Championship
IIHF World Championship
Sport in Ostrava
2000s in Prague